is a railway station on the Gonō Line in the town of Fukaura, Aomori Prefecture, Japan, operated by East Japan Railway Company (JR East).

Lines

Station layout
WeSPa-Tsubakiyama Station has a single side platform serving bidirectional traffic. The station is unattended.

History
WeSPa-Tsubakiyama Station opened on December 1, 2001. Initially, only the special express Resort Shirakami stopped at this station. From December 2, 2002, all local services on the Gonō Line also began stopping at this station.

Surrounding area
WeSPa Tsubakiyama Resort

See also
 List of railway stations in Japan

References

External links

  
WeSPa Tsubakiyama official site 

Stations of East Japan Railway Company
Railway stations in Aomori Prefecture
Gonō Line
Fukaura, Aomori
Railway stations in Japan opened in 2001